Antafiambotry is a municipality in Madagascar. It belongs to the district of Ambanja, which is a part of Diana Region. According to 2018 census the population was 6,614.

Primary and junior level secondary education are available in town. The majority 50% of the population works in fishing. 49% are farmers.  The most important crop is coffee, while other important products are seeds of catechu and pepper.  Services provide employment for 1% of the population.

Nosy Faly is part of the territory of the commune of Antafiambotry.

References and notes 

Populated places in Diana Region